Paris Saint-Germain Football Club, commonly referred to as Paris Saint-Germain, Paris, Paris SG or simply PSG is a professional football club based in Paris, France. They compete in Ligue 1, the top division of French football. As France's most successful club, they have won over 40 official honours, including ten league titles and one major European trophy. Their home ground is the Parc des Princes.

The Parisians were founded in 1970, following the merger of Paris FC and Stade Saint-Germain. PSG won their first major honour, the French Cup, in 1982 and their first Division 1 title in 1986. The 1990s was among the most successful periods in the club's history; they claimed a second league title, three French Cups, two French League Cups, two French Super Cups and the UEFA Cup Winners' Cup in 1996. After suffering a decline in fortunes during the 2000s, the Red and Blues have enjoyed a revival since 2011 with increased financial backing, achieving unparalleled dominance in domestic competitions, winning multiple league titles and national cups. PSG have also become a regular feature in the UEFA Champions League, reaching their first final in 2020.

PSG have the most consecutive seasons playing in France's top flight and are one of two French clubs to have won a major European title. They are the most popular football club in France and one of the most widely supported teams in the world. PSG's home kit colours are red, blue, and white, and their crest features the Eiffel Tower and a fleur-de-lis. Paris have a longstanding rivalry with Olympique de Marseille; the duo contest French football's most notorious match, Le Classique.

Tamim bin Hamad Al Thani, the Emir of Qatar, owns Paris Saint-Germain through closed shareholders Qatar Sports Investments (QSI), which purchased the club in 2011. The takeover made PSG the richest club in France and one of the wealthiest in the world. Paris currently have the fifth-highest revenue in the footballing world with an annual revenue of €654m according to Deloitte, and are the world's seventh-most valuable football club, worth $3.2bn according to Forbes.

History

Creation and split (1970–1973)

In the summer of 1970, an ambitious group of businessmen decided to create a major team in the French capital. Guy Crescent and Pierre-Étienne Guyot chose to merge their virtual side, Paris FC, created in 1969, with Stade Saint-Germain of Henri Patrelle after the team from Saint-Germain-en-Laye, 15 km west of Paris and founded in 1904, won promotion to Division 2. However, the three men were stuck with the financial feasibility of the project until they met Real Madrid president Santiago Bernabéu. He told them that starting a crowdfunding campaign was the best solution to establish a new team.20,000 people backed the project and Paris Saint-Germain were formed on 17 June 1970. Guyot was elected the club's first president a few days later. For the first time in French football history, the fans had financially contributed in the making of a club. The merger was made official following the creation of the club's association on 12 August 1970. PSG retains this day as their foundation date.

Paris FC contributed with the financial backing, while Stade Saint-Germain provided the sporting infrastructure, from the Division 2 status to the Camp des Loges training center, as well as the manager Pierre Phelipon and most of the players, including Bernard Guignedoux, Michel Prost and Camille Choquier. PSG further strengthened their squad with the signing of Jean Djorkaeff, captain of the French national team. PSG's first official game was a 1–1 league draw away to Poitiers on 23 August 1970. Guignedoux scored the club's first ever goal from a free-kick. The club went on to clinch promotion to Division 1 and claim the Division 2 title in its inaugural season.

PSG's first top-flight season ended with a safe 16th place, meaning they would stay in Division 1 next year, but behind the scenes the club was in a delicate financial situation. Back in September 1971, the Paris City Council offered 850k francs to pay the club's debt and save its place in the elite, demanding PSG in return to adopt the more Parisian name "Paris Football Club." Crescent, who had replaced Guyot as club president before the start of the season, was in favor of the name change, but Patrelle was against it. The disagreement led to Crescent's resignation in December 1971, handing the presidency to Patrelle. The latter tried to persuade the council to reconsider their position, but they remained inflexible and the club split on 1 June 1972, a few days after the last match of the campaign. Backed by the council, Crescent re-formed Paris FC and remained in Division 1, while the PSG of Patrelle were administratively relegated to Division 3, thus losing professional status.

Top-flight return and Parc des Princes move (1973–1978)

Paris Saint-Germain really took flight with the arrival of fashion designer Daniel Hechter as chairman of the management committee in June 1973. Besides offering his financial support to the club, he also designed the team's classic home outfit. Hechter then shocked the national game ahead of 1973–74 by appointing French legend Just Fontaine as sporting director.

Robert Vicot's men finished second in Group B, four points behind Red Star, qualifying for the promotion play–offs against Valenciennes. PSG lost 1–2 away to Valenciennes, but PSG recorded an incredible 4–2 comeback at the Parc des Princes, thus achieving promotion to Division 1 and regaining its professional status abandoned two years earlier. Overwhelmed by emotion, Fontaine collapsed on the lawn and was then carried by the players in celebration. Since then, PSG have always played in the first tier of French football.

PSG played their first game at the Parc des Princes during this campaign. It was against fellow Parisian side Red Star on 10 November 1973. PSG won 3–1 and Othniel Dossevi scored the club's first goal at the stadium. The Parisians also began their tradition of brilliant Coupe de France runs, reaching the quarterfinals after beating Metz at the Parc in front of 25,000 spectators (2–1; 4–1 on agreggate).

In an ironic turn of events, Paris FC were relegated to Division 2 at the same time as Paris Saint-Germain moved up to the top flight in 1974, leaving their home stadium, the Parc des Princes, in the hands of their estranged Parisian brothers. Since then, the Parc has been the home of PSG. With promotion to Division 1 also came a change of command. Daniel Hechter, then chairman of the management committee, took over as club president in June 1974 following the resignation of Patrelle. He named Francis Borelli as vice-president.

Under Hechter's tenure, the Parisians failed to win any silverware in the 1970s but began their tradition of brilliant Coupe de France runs, established themselves in Division 1, and attracted several prestigious players, including Jean-Pierre Dogliani, Mustapha Dahleb and Carlos Bianchi. After Hechter was banned for life from football by the French Football Federation in January 1978, for running a ticketing scheme at the Parc des Princes, Francis Borelli, who had been vice-president until then, became the new boss of the Île-de-France club.

First major honours and decline (1978–1991)

Following the arrival of manager Georges Peyroche in November 1979, the club established itself as a top-half team and then welcomed its first major honour when the Parisians reached their first French Cup final in 1982. Up against the great Saint-Étienne of Michel Platini at the Parc des Princes, Nambatingue Toko opened the scoring for PSG following a good cross from Ivica Šurjak. Saint-Étienne reacted and Platini equalized to send the game to extra-time. Platini then doubled his personal account, giving the Greens the lead. The Parc des Princes faithful no longer believed in their team when Dominique Rocheteau, after yet another assist from Šurjak, scored an unexpected equalizer in the last seconds of the match. PSG fans invaded the field in joy, while club president Francis Borelli kneeled and kissed the lawn of the Parc. Following an interruption of 30 minutes, the penalty shootout sealed PSG's coronation. Dominique Baratelli stopped Saint-Étienne's last attempt and Jean-Marc Pilorget scored the winning penalty for the capital side. This success opened the doors to Europe, where PSG made an impressive continental debut in reaching the quarterfinals of the 1982–83 European Cup Winners' Cup.

On the domestic scene, results were just as satisfying. PSG captured their first podium finish, coming in 3rd place, and repeated the feat in the 1983 Coupe de France Final, this time against Nantes. Recently crowned French champions, the Canaries were headed for the league-cup double, leading at the break after overturning Pascal Zaremba's early strike. But PSG managed their own comeback in the second half as Sušić equalized and then assisted Toko for the winning goal (3–2). The campaign ended on a sad note, though, as Georges Peyroche left the club.

Three years later, under the guidance of manager Gérard Houllier, PSG claimed their maiden league crown in 1985–86. They dominated the championship from start to finish thanks in big part to the likes of Joël Bats, Dominique Bathenay, Luis Fernandez, Dominique Rocheteau and Safet Sušić, all of whom made up the backbone of the team. The victory away to Toulouse on Matchday 3 meant PSG sat at the top of the table for the first time ever, a spot they never relinquished, going a memorable 26 matches without defeat towards the title.

The follow-up to the league title was not as glorious though. Defending champions PSG finished the league in 7th place, suffered an early exit from the French Cup and were knocked out by Czech minnows Vítkovice in the first round of a disappointing European Cup debut. The following year, PSG avoided relegation on the final match of the 1987–88 season thanks to a dramatic 0–1 win away to Le Havre. Highly indebted, the club briefly bounced back, fighting for the 1988–89 league crown with Marseille, before going into decline.

Canal+ takeover and golden era (1991–1998)

The takeover by television giants Canal+ in 1991 revitalised Paris Saint-Germain as they became one of the richest clubs in France. Canal+ wiped out PSG's huge debt and appointed Michel Denisot, journalist on the channel, as club president in place of Francis Borelli. Now enjoying serious investment, the Red and Blues were able to set their sights steadily higher: they had to qualify for European competitions in their first season and become French champions within three years. In consequence, Canal+ increased the club's budget from 90 to 120 million francs in order to build a strong squad for the 1991–92 season. The revolution began with the appointment of renowned coach Artur Jorge, famous for leading Porto to the 1986–87 European Cup trophy. The club then embarked on a spending spree, signing Brazilian stars Ricardo and Valdo as well as proven French players Paul Le Guen, Laurent Fournier, Patrick Colleter and prolific Liberian striker George Weah.

The 1992–93 season also marked the beginning of Le Classique, the rivalry between Paris Saint-Germain and Marseille, as both teams battled each other on the field for the 1992–93 French Division 1 crown. PSG finished runners-up after losing both games against Marseille. In the second match between the two clubs, only three days after winning the 1992–93 UEFA Champions League, league leaders Marseille welcomed closest challengers PSG in a match that would determine the title. After Marseille won their fifth consecutive championship, Bernard Tapie and  Marseille were found guilty of match-fixing in what became known as the French football bribery scandal.  The French Football Federation stripped Marseille of their title and offered it to second-placed PSG, who refused it because club owners Canal+ thought that claiming the trophy would anger their subscribers back in Marseille. As a result, the 1992–93 title remained unattributed, with Canal+ even refused letting the capital club participate in next year's UEFA Champions League after UEFA excluded Marseille from the competition. Instead, Monaco, who finish third in Ligue 1 took the Champions League spot instead.

Considered the club's golden era, the Parisians won nine trophies and reached five consecutive European semi-finals during the 1990s, including their first UEFA Champions League last-four appearance and two at the same stage of the UEFA Cup. PSG's crowning glory came in the 1996 UEFA Cup Winners' Cup Final with legend Luis Fernandez now as coach. Bruno Ngotty scored the only goal of the match to defeat Rapid Wien and make Paris the second French club to ever clinch a major European tournament and the youngest club in history to win a European title at 26 years of existence.  The following season, PSG finished runners-up in the 1996 UEFA Super Cup and 1997 UEFA Cup Winners' Cup Final. On the domestic scene, results were just as satisfying, with Paris celebrating a second league title, three French Cups, two French League Cups and just as many French Super Cup wins.

Crisis mode and relegation battles (1998–2011)

PSG then went into decline following years of mismanagement. In the summer 2000, PSG spent heavily on new players signing Nicolas Anelka, Peter Luccin and Stéphane Dalmat as part of the "PSG Banlieue" project of its shareholder Canal+, with the goal of winning Ligue 1 and performing a solid UEFA Champions League campaign but it was a failure. In 2003, the club faced a massive financial loss with a deficit of €65 million, leading Canal+ to fire Luis Fernandez as coach and Laurent Perpère as president and replacing them with Vahid Halilhodžić, who became the new coach and Francis Graille the new president. The club's form dwindled as they slipped further down the table and eventually, a split from owners Canal+ became inevitable.

At the start of the 21st century, PSG struggled to rescale the heights despite the magic of Ronaldinho and the goals of Pauleta. Five more trophies arrived in the form of three French Cups (including one against Le Classique arch-rivals Marseille in 2006), one French League Cup and one UEFA Intertoto Cup, but the club became better known for lurching from one high-profile crisis to another. Following years of mismanagement, the club's form dwindled as they slipped further down the table and a split from Canal+ became inevitable.

The French premium television channel sold the club to Colony Capital in 2006. The situation, however, only got worse and PSG spent the 2006–07 and 2007–08 campaigns staving off relegations. The latter was the most dramatic. Marred by poor results and fan violence, Paris avoided the drop on the final match after a 2–1 win at Sochaux. The hero was Ivorian striker Amara Diané who scored both goals that night. Despite not enjoying the star status of other current or past PSG greats, Diané is still considered a legend by most Parisian fans.

QSI ownership and domestic dominance (2011–present)
After two years of solid progress and stability under the stewardship of manager Antoine Kombouaré and president Robin Leproux, the fortunes of Paris Saint-Germain changed dramatically when Qatar Sports Investments (QSI) purchased the club in 2011. The takeover made PSG not only the richest club in France but one of the wealthiest in the world. Club president Nasser Al-Khelaifi pledged to form a team capable of winning the UEFA Champions League and making the club France's biggest name.

Club legend Leonardo was brought back in a sporting director capacity and oversaw a spending spree in summer 2011 that has so far been unprecedented in Ligue 1 history, including the signings of Blaise Matuidi, Salvatore Sirigu, Maxwell, Kevin Gameiro and Javier Pastore. As a result, the Parisians have dominated French football, despite finishing behind Montpellier in 2011–12, the elusive league crown was finally brought back to Paris in 2012–13 driven by star player Zlatan Ibrahimović, team captain Thiago Silva and famous manager Carlo Ancelotti. During the season, ahead of the winter transfer deadline it was announced that David Beckham signed a five-month deal with the club. Zlatan's 30-goal haul almost single-handedly led the capital side to its first Ligue 1 title in 19 years, and third overall. They also became a regular in the knockout stages of the Champions League, being eliminated from the UEFA Champions League on away goals by Barcelona in the quarter-finals after drawing both games. Big money signings continued with the arrivals of Edinson Cavani in 2013 for a league record of €64 million, making it the sixth largest transfer in history and David Luiz in 2014 for a £50 million transfer fee, a world-record transfer for a defender. Despite the departure of Carlo Ancelotti, PSG kept its winning ways under Laurent Blanc. The club secured a maiden domestic treble (Ligue 1, Coupe de la Ligue and Trophée des Champions) in the 2013–14 season, before claiming an unprecedented national quadruple (Ligue 1, Coupe de France, Coupe de la Ligue and Trophée des Champions) twice in a row in 2014–15 and 2015–16, winning the latter with a record-breaking 96 points, becoming the only first French men's team to achieve that feat.

Fresh from three consecutive UEFA Europa League titles with Sevilla, Unai Emery was hired by PSG for his European pedigree. But with star player Zlatan Ibrahimović gone, the club endured a disappointing 2016–17 season. Paris were pipped to the Ligue 1 title by Monaco, missing out on top spot for the first time in five years. Meanwhile, in the UEFA Champions League, the club suffered several disappointing nights, including arguably the club's most painful continental defeat in the infamous and controversial "La Remontada" ("The Comeback") against Barcelona, losing 6–1 in the second leg of the round of sixteen, despite winning the first leg in France by a score of 4–0.

In response, PSG signed Neymar for a world-record fee of €222 million and French prodigy Kylian Mbappé on an initial loan, which was made permanent in 2018 in a transfer worth €180 million plus add ons, making him both the second-most expensive player and most expensive teenager. The capital club reclaimed the Ligue 1 title and also won the Trophée des Champions, the Coupe de la Ligue and the Coupe de France, clinching the domestic quadruple for the third time in four seasons. Despite their massive expenditure, in the Champions League, PSG lost to Real Madrid in the round of 16, leading manager Unai Emery to leave the club at the end of the season.

In May 2018, Thomas Tuchel signed a two-year contract with PSG, replacing Unai Emery. Paris Saint-Germain again fell in the Champions League round of 16 in 2018–19, suffering a shock 3–1 defeat at home to Manchester United after winning the first leg 2–0 at Old Trafford. This season, they also won the Ligue 1 for the 8th time in their history, but lost in the Coupe de France Final against Rennes. PSG were eliminated from the Coupe de la Ligue in embarrassing fashion, as they lost 2–1 at home to Guingamp in the quarterfinals. In the 2019–20 season, PSG won the Ligue 1 for the 9th time in their history, despite the season ending prematurely due to the COVID-19 pandemic, and also reclaimed the Coupe de France defeating Saint-Étienne in the final and won the last-ever Coupe de la Ligue defeating Lyon in a penalty shootout. In the 2019–20 UEFA Champions League, PSG reached the semi-finals for the second time since 1995, after a last minute 2–1 win over Atalanta, before losing to Bayern Munich 1–0 in the finals in Lisbon, with former PSG player Kingsley Coman scoring the winning goal.

Tuchel's tenure at Paris Saint-Germain was marred by a fractured relationship with the club's hierarchy, leading him to be dismissed on 24 December, despite placing top of their Champions League group. On 2 January 2021, former PSG player Mauricio Pochettino was appointed as the new head coach. PSG's good form in the Champions League continued in 2021 with a second consecutive UCL semi-final appearance, a first for the club. Domestically, PSG won the Coupe de France, but failed to retain the Ligue 1 title, finishing one point behind Lille, losing the league for the second time in four years.

During the 2021 summer transfer season, PSG completed one of the most historic transfer windows in football history, exercising the option to buy Danilo Pereira and signing Achraf Hakimi from Inter Milan for a reported fee of €60 million. In addition, the club registered the free transfers of Georginio Wijnaldum, Sergio Ramos, and Gianluigi Donnarumma. PSG concluded their transfer window with the signing of one of the greatest players of all time and record Ballon d'Or winner Lionel Messi, who unexpectedly left Barcelona following the expiration of his contract, and promising defender Nuno Mendes on an initial loan, which was made permanent in 2022. Later in the season, PSG went on to reclaim the Ligue 1 title for the record 10th time, but fell short in the Champions League at the hands of Real Madrid in the round of 16, a tie amplified by the uncertainty surrounding Kylian Mbappé's future. However, on 21 May 2022, Mbappé extended his contract with PSG until 2025, despite speculations of a possible transfer to Real Madrid, which prompted La Liga officials to file a complaint to UEFA regarding accumulating losses of PSG in the previous years.

Unsatisfied with the club direction and lack of European success club president Nasser Al-Khelaifi promised mega-changes heading into next season and stated the team would not win the UEFA Champions League as currently constructed. This was in an interview with Le Parisien. Changes were needed at the club on a very deep level and as such during the pre season for the 2022–23 season the club embarked on an ambitious rebuild. This began with the hiring of transfer market expert Luís Campos who made his name at Monaco first and then Lille. A change in club ethos was noted, and was followed by the sacking of first team coach Pochettino, while an announcement for the hiring of Christophe Galtier was made in quick succession. A busy pre-season followed with a new transfer policy of "no bling-bling", the club quickly signed Nuno Mendes, Vitinha, Hugo Ekitike and Nordi Mukiele. Meanwhile a lot of older players who were not committed to the project were transfer listed.

Identity

Colours and mascot

Since their foundation, Paris Saint-Germain have represented both the city of Paris and the nearby royal town of Saint-Germain-en-Laye. As a result, red, blue and white are the club's traditional colours. The red and blue are Parisian colours, a nod to revolutionary figures Lafayette and Jean Sylvain Bailly, and the white is a symbol of French royalty and Saint-Germain-en-Laye.

On the club's crest, the Eiffel Tower in red and the blue background represent Paris, while the fleur de lys in white is a hint to the coat of arms of Saint-Germain-en-Laye. The fleur de lys is a royal symbol as well and recalls that French King Louis XIV was born in the town. Throughout its history, PSG have brandished several crests, but all of them have featured the club's three historical colours.

Likewise, PSG's most iconic shirts have been predominantly red, blue or white, with the remaining two colours included as well. The club's official mascot, Germain the Lynx, also sports PSG's traditional colours. It was unveiled during the 2010 Tournoi de Paris in commemoration of the club's 40th anniversary, and can be seen entertaining kids in the stands of the Parc des Princes or near the pitch with the players during the warm-up.

Anthems and mottos

"Allez Paris!," recorded by Belgian actress and singer Annie Cordy in 1971, was the club's first official anthem. A PSG fan from the start, she was part of an association of hundreds of celebrities who contributed to the club's foundation in 1970. The club's second anthem, "Allez Paris-Saint-Germain!" by Les Parisiens, was recorded in 1977, replacing Cordy's version. An initiative of historical PSG leader and music producer Charles Talar, he produced and released it under his homonym record label. The song's chorus became a popular chant among PSG supporters during games. A new version, also called "Allez Paris-Saint-Germain!," was recorded in 2010 as part of the club's 40th anniversary celebrations. Sung to the tune of "Go West" by Village People, the lyrics were rewritten with suggestions made by fans. This is the club's current official anthem.

"Ô Ville Lumière" ("Oh City of Light"), to the tune of "Flower of Scotland," is another veritable club anthem for PSG supporters. Other notable chants from supporters' groups in the Boulogne and Auteuil stands include "Le Parc est à nous" ("The Parc is ours"), "Ici, c'est Paris!" ("This is Paris!"), and "Paris est magique!" ("Paris is magical!"). Both stands began exchanging these chants during PSG matches in the 1990s. "Ici, c'est Paris!" and "Paris est magique!" are also the club's most iconic mottos. "Who Said I Would" by Phill Collins is also a traditional anthem for the fans. The song has accompanied the players' entry into the field since 1992.

Iconic shirts

During their first three seasons of existence, the home shirt of Paris Saint-Germain was red with blue and white details in its sleeves and neck to bring together the three colours of the club: the red and blue of Paris, and the white of Saint-Germain-en-Laye. During the 2010–11 season, PSG wore a red shirt during home matches to commemorate their 40th anniversary.

The connection between Paris Saint-Germain and the city's fashion houses is a longstanding one. French fashion designer Daniel Hechter became PSG president in 1973 and designed the club's traditional home look that same year: a blue shirt with a red vertical stripe flanked by two thinner white stripes (blue-white-red-white-blue). First worn in the 1973–74 season, the so-called "Hechter shirt" has remained the classic home identity of PSG ever since.

The famous jersey made its debut during a home Ligue 2 game against Red Star on 10 November 1973. This was also the club's maiden match at the Parc des Princes. PSG won 3–1 as Othniel Dossevi scored the club's first goal at the stadium as well as the first with the Hechter shirt. PSG stars from the 1990s and 2000s like Raí, Ronaldinho and Pauleta are associated with this kit. While wearing it, the capital club reached five European semi-finals in a row between 1993 and 1997, claimed the 1995–96 UEFA Cup Winners' Cup and achieved eight consecutive wins against Le Classique arch-rivals Olympique de Marseille between 2002 and 2004.

The general belief is that Hechter based his creation on the red-and-white jersey worn by Ajax, the dominant team in Europe at the time, but with the French flag in mind. Hechter himself has denied this, though, instead claiming he was inspired by the Ford Mustang. He transposed the car's hood stripes on the shirt and employed the three colours of the club. The Hechter shirt has two alternate versions: the "reversed Hechter" (red-white-blue-white-red), introduced in the 1974–75 season, and the "white Hechter" (white-blue-red-blue-white), which premiered in the 1994–95 season.

It was with the club's most iconic away outfit, though, that fans saw the first big PSG team which won their maiden Coupe de France titles in 1982 and 1983, experienced their first European campaign in 1983 and claimed their maiden league crown in 1986. The shirt was white with blue and red vertical stripes on the left. Like the Hechter jersey, it debuted in the 1973–74 season as the away kit. Promoted by PSG president Francis Borelli, the white shirt was the club's home identity from 1981 to 1990. Now known as the "Borelli shirt," it is synonym with PSG legends from the 1980s like Safet Sušić, Luis Fernández and Dominique Bathenay.

Crest evolution

The club's first crest was basically the same as the original Paris FC (PFC) logo. Having to merge and give birth to PSG using Stade Saint-Germain's stadium, the PFC crest kept its original design but the name below it changed from "Paris FC" to "Paris Saint-Germain Football Club." This badge consisted of a blue football with a red vessel inside it. The latter is a historic symbol of Paris and is present in the city's coat of arms. The name of the club was written below in red.

PSG, however, split from PFC in 1972 and thus needed a new crest. Representing both Paris and Saint-Germain-en-Laye, the club's second crest became the basis of the one the fans know today. The round logo featured the Eiffel Tower in red against a blue background and, underneath it, two Saint-Germain symbols in white: a fleur de lys and Louis XIV's cradle. Created by Christian Lentretien, former PSG board member and publicist by profession, this crest was first used in 1972 and lasted until 1982. The Parc des Princes, the club's home stadium, appeared below it between 1982 and 1990.

The stadium was dropped from the crest in 1990. Two years later, then club owners Canal+ radically changed it in 1992. The new model had the acronym "PSG" in white against a blue-white-red-white-blue background (like the colour pattern of the Hechter shirt) with "Paris Saint-Germain" underneath in white against a black background. Under pressure from supporters, the traditional crest returned in 1995 with "Paris Saint-Germain" above the tower and "1970" below the cradle. This logo went through a slight facelift in 2002, most notably featuring a darker shade of blue.

At the request of the club's Qatari owners, the traditional crest underwent a major makeover in 2013. “Paris” is now written in big white bold letters above a large Eiffel Tower, clearly putting forward the brand “Paris” instead of “Paris Saint-Germain.” Underneath it, “Saint-Germain” is written in smaller letters below the fleur de lys. The cradle and the club's founding year "1970" were left out. PSG deputy general manager Jean-Claude Blanc said: “We are called Paris Saint-Germain but, above all, we are called Paris.”

Friendly tournaments

Paris Saint-Germain used to host two very famous invitational competitions: the Tournoi de Paris and the Tournoi Indoor de Paris-Bercy. Regarded as French football's most prestigious friendly tournament, the Tournoi de Paris is considered a precursor of both the Intercontinental Cup and the FIFA Club World Cup. PSG began hosting it in 1975 and were crowned champions a record seven times. Held at the Parc des Princes, the Tournoi de Paris was last organized in 2012. The Tournoi Indoor de Paris-Bercy was an indoor football tournament founded by PSG in 1984 and held annually until 1991 at the AccorHotels Arena in the 12th arrondissement of Paris. Played indoors on a synthetic field and featuring seven-a-side teams, the competition featured hosts PSG and five more clubs. The Parisians lifted the trophy on two occasions, more than any other club.

Grounds

Stadiums

Paris Saint-Germain played their first game at their current home stadium, the 47,929-seater Parc des Princes, against Ligue 2 promotion rivals Red Star on 10 November 1973. It was the curtain-raiser for that season's opening Ligue 1 match between Paris FC and Sochaux. PSG moved into the ground upon its return to Ligue 1 in 1974, ironically the same year that Paris FC were relegated. Up until that point it had been the home venue of Paris FC.

During their early years, PSG played at several grounds including the Stade Municipal Georges Lefèvre, the Stade Jean-Bouin, the Stade Bauer, the Stade Yves-du-Manoir and even the Parc a few times despite the reluctance of Paris FC. Ever since PSG moved to the Parc, the pitches of the Georges Lefèvre have hosted training sessions and home matches for the club's academy sides. The complex is located in Saint-Germain-en-Laye, just across the street from the Camp des Loges, the club's training center.

Training facilities

Located in Saint-Germain-en-Laye, the Camp des Loges has been the club's training ground since 1970. The current Camp des Loges, built on the same site as the old one, was inaugurated in November 2008. It was then renamed Ooredoo Training Centre in September 2013 as part of a sponsorship deal with Ooredoo.

The Paris Saint-Germain Training Center will be the club's new training ground and sports complex. It will replace the Camp des Loges upon its completion in June 2023. Owned and financed by the club, the venue will bring together PSG's male football, handball and judo teams, as well as the football and handball academies. The club, however, will remain closely linked to their historic birthplace in Saint-Germain-en-Laye as the Camp des Loges will become the training ground of the female football team and academy.

Records and statistics

Paris Saint-Germain holds many records, most notably being the most successful French club in history in terms of official titles won, with 47. They are the record holders of all national competitions, having clinched ten Ligue 1 championships, fourteen Coupe de France, nine Coupe de la Ligue, and eleven Trophée des Champions. Their trophy cabinet also includes one Ligue 2 title. In international football, PSG have claimed one UEFA Cup Winners' Cup and one UEFA Intertoto Cup.

Their victory in the 1995–96 UEFA Cup Winners' Cup makes PSG the sole French side to have won this trophy, one of only two French clubs to have won a major European competition, and the youngest European team to do so. They are also the only side to have won the Coupe de France without conceding a single goal (1992–93 and 2016–17), five Coupe de la Ligue in a row (2014–2018), four back-to-back Coupe de France (2015–2018), and eight consecutive Trophée des Champions (2013–2020).

PSG have won all four national titles in a single season on four occasions. This feat is known as the domestic quadruple. The Red and Blues have completed the domestic double, the league and league cup double, the domestic cup double, the domestic treble and the league three-peat several times as well. Therefore, PSG are the club with the most domestic doubles and league and league cup doubles, one of two sides to have achieved the league three-peat twice, and the only team to have won the domestic cup double, the domestic treble and the domestic quadruple.

Since their inception, PSG have completed 52 seasons, of which 49 have been played in the highest division in French football, known as Ligue 1. In 2021–22, they celebrated their 48th consecutive campaign in Ligue 1, which makes them the competitions's longest-serving club. PSG have played continuously in Ligue 1 from the 1974–75 season onwards. Since then, the Parisians have won ten league titles, finishing first more frequently than in any other position. Having come second in nine league campaigns, PSG have therefore made up the top two spots on 19 occasions. They have also reached the top five 27 times, which represents more than half of the club's seasons in Ligue 1. PSG's lowest-ever finish is 16th, both in 1971–72 (their first in Ligue 1) and 2007–08, when they escaped relegation on the final day of the season, with a 2–1 win at Sochaux.

Supporters

Paris Saint-Germain is the most popular football club in France and one of the most widely supported teams in the world. Famous PSG fans include Nicolas Sarkozy, Tony Parker, Fabio Quartararo, Tom Brady, Patrick Dempsey, Victoria Azarenka, Teddy Riner, and DJ Snake.

Lacking a big passionate fanbase, the club began offering cheaper season tickets to young supporters in 1976. These fans were placed in the Kop K, located in the K section of the Borelli stand at the Parc des Princes. Following an increase in ticket prices, Kop K supporters moved to the Boulogne stand in 1978, and the Kop of Boulogne (KoB) was born. There, the club's first Italian-style ultra group, Boulogne Boys, was founded in 1985. Other KoB groups, however, took British hooligans as dubious role models and violence rapidly escalated. PSG supporters' groups have been linked to football hooliganism ever since.

PSG owners Canal+ responded in 1991 by encouraging and financing non-violent fans of the KoB stand to take place in the Auteuil stand at the other end of the Parc des Princes. The Virage Auteuil was born, alongside Supras Auteuil, its most notorious ultras. At first the measure worked but, slowly, a violent rivalry arose between the two stands. Things came to a head in 2010 before a match against Olympique de Marseille in Paris. Boulogne fan Yann Lorence was killed following a fight between groups from both stands outside the Parc des Princes, forcing PSG president Robin Leproux to take action.

The club exiled the supporters' groups from the Parc des Princes and banned them from all PSG matches in what was known as Plan Leproux. It made PSG pay the price in terms of atmosphere, with one of Europe's most feared venues now subdued. For their part, former Virage Auteuil supporters formed the Collectif Ultras Paris (CUP) in February 2016, with the aim of reclaiming their place at the stadium. In October 2016, after a six-year absence, the club agreed to their return. Grouped in the Auteuil end of the stadium, the CUP currently is the only ultra association officially recognized by PSG. The ultra movement has also started to come back to life in the Boulogne stand. New groups Block Parisii, Paname Rebirth and Résistance Parisienne are trying to convince the club of relaunching the Kop of Boulogne.

Rivalries

Le Classique

Paris Saint-Germain shares an intense rivalry with Olympique de Marseille; matches between the two teams are referred to as Le Classique. The clubs are the two most successful clubs in French football, and the only French teams to have won major European trophies. Therefore, the fixture is the biggest rivalry in France.

PSG and OM were the dominant teams prior to the emergence of Olympique Lyonnais in the 2000s, and are the most followed French teams internationally. Both clubs are at or near the top of the French attendance lists each season. Their meetings during the 1970s gave little indication the two would become major adversaries. The newly formed Parisians were trying to assemble a competitive team, while the Olympians were Ligue 1 contenders.

The rivalry began in earnest in 1986 when PSG won their first championship and OM was bought by Bernard Tapie. By the end of the decade, PSG was fighting for the 1988–89 title against Tapie's Marseille. The accusations made by PSG president Francis Borelli against Tapie and OM for fixing matches during that season were a contributor to their growing rivalry.

In the 1990s, tensions between the two sides escalated. French TV channel Canal+ bought PSG in 1991 with the aim of breaking Marseille's hegemony but then agreed with Tapie to emphasize the animosity between them as a way to promote the league. With equivalent financial backing, PSG and OM became the main contenders in the title race. Both sides were less successful in the late 1990s and the 2000s but the rivalry remained strong. Since the 2010s, the matchup has been dominated by PSG, and the significant investment of their Qatari owners has created a wide gap between the clubs.

Ownership and finances

During its first three years of existence, Paris Saint-Germain were fan-owned and had 20,000 members. The club was run by board members Guy Crescent, Pierre-Étienne Guyot and Henri Patrelle. A group of wealthy French businessmen, led by Daniel Hechter and Francis Borelli, would then buy the club in 1973. PSG changed hands in 1991, when Canal+ took over, and then again in 2006 with the arrival of Colony Capital. Tamim bin Hamad Al Thani, the Emir of Qatar, has been PSG's owner since 2011 through Qatar Sports Investments (QSI).

QSI acquired a majority stake in June 2011 and then became the club's sole owner in March 2012. This means PSG are a state-owned club, the only of its kind, and thus one of the richest teams in the world. QSI chairman Nasser Al-Khelaifi has been PSG president since the takeover. Al Thani, however, has the final word on every major decision of the club. He is both the chairman of the QIA and the founder of QSI.

Upon its arrival, QSI pledged to form a team capable of winning the UEFA Champions League. PSG have spent over €1.3bn on player transfers since the summer of 2011. These massive expenditures have translated in PSG's domination of French football but have not yet brought home the coveted UCL trophy as well as causing problems with UEFA's Financial Fair Play regulations.

PSG currently have the fifth-highest revenue in the footballing world with an annual turnover of €654m according to Deloitte, and are the world's seventh-most valuable football club, worth $3.2bn according to Forbes magazine. PSG's strong financial position has been sustained by the club's Qatari owners; the team's on-pitch success; high-profile signings, including Zlatan Ibrahimović, Neymar, Kylian Mbappé and Lionel Messi; and lucrative sponsorship deals with the Qatar Tourism Authority, Nike, Air Jordan, Accor and Qatar Airways.

Honours

As of the 2022 Trophée des Champions.

 
  shared record

Players

First-team squad
As of 31 January 2023.

Elite group
The elite group consists of players from the academy who train with the first team.

Out on loan

Other players under contract

Personnel

As of 13 January 2023.

Management

Technical staff

References

External links

  
 Paris Saint-Germain – Ligue 1
 Paris Saint-Germain – UEFA.com

 
Football clubs in Paris
Association football clubs established in 1970
G-14 clubs
16th arrondissement of Paris
Ligue 1 clubs
1970 establishments in France
P
UEFA Intertoto Cup winning clubs
Unrelegated association football clubs
Football clubs in Île-de-France